Acmaturris brisis is a species of sea snail, a marine gastropod mollusk in the family Mangeliidae.

Description
The length of the shell attains 8.3 mm.

Distribution
This marine species occurs off Brazil. Fossils have been found in Pliocene strata of the Bowden Formation, Jamaica, age range: 3.6 to 2.588 Ma.

References

 W. P. Woodring. 1928. Miocene Molluscs from Bowden, Jamaica. Part 2: Gastropods and discussion of results . Contributions to the Geology and Palaeontology of the West Indies
 Benkendorfer, Gabriela, and Abílio Soares-Gomes. "Biogeography and biodiversity of gastropod molluscs from the eastern Brazilian continental shelf and slope." Latin american journal of aquatic research 37.2 (2009): 143–159.

External links
 

brisis
Gastropods described in 1928